Thomas (died 1282 or 1283) was a Hungarian prelate in the second half of the 13th century, who served as Bishop-elect of Várad (present-day Oradea, Romania) from 1279 to 1282.

Career
The origin and early life of Thomas are unknown. Succeeding the foreign cleric Bonaventura, Thomas functioned as provost of the collegiate chapter of Vasvár between 1272 and 1279. He was elected as Bishop of Várad in the second half of 1279, since the provostship of Vasvár was vacant at that time. Thomas is first styled as bishop-elected in July 1280 by contemporary records.

Despite the unanimous request of the cathedral chapter of Várad, papal legate Philip of Fermo refused to confirm Thomas' election. Philip objected that Thomas was not ordained to the priesthood within one year of his election as provost, despite the decrees of the Second Council of Lyon. The chapter of Várad appealed to the Roman Curia thereafter, citing that the decree was applied only to the provosts dealing with pastoral care, while Vasvár was a collegiate chapter. Pope Martin IV accepted the argument and authorized the metropolitan John Hont-Pázmány, Archbishop of Kalocsa and his two suffragans – Pouka of Syrmia and Gregory of Csanád – on 18 June 1282 to confirm Thomas' election.

Thomas was referred to as a deceased person in August 1283. He left his family a considerable fortune at his death, who, however, soon began to litigate with each other for the estates and servants. He was succeeded by Bartholomew in 1284.

References

Sources

External links
 Diocese information at Catholic Hierarchy

1280s deaths
13th-century Hungarian people
Bishops of Várad
13th-century Roman Catholic bishops in Hungary